The Andrew Community School District is a public school district headquartered in Andrew, Iowa.  The district is completely within Jackson County and serves the town of Andrew and the surrounding rural areas.

Chris Fee became superintendent of both Andrew and Easton Valley Community School District in 2016.

Schools
The district operates two schools in Andrew:
 Andrew Elementary School
 Andrew Middle School

Students from Andrew attend high school at either Bellevue or Maquoketa.

Enrollment

References

External links
 Andrew Community School District

School districts in Iowa
Education in Jackson County, Iowa